Missing Daughters is a 1924 American silent crime drama film directed by William H. Clifford and starring Eileen Percy, Pauline Starke and Claire Adams.

Cast
 Eileen Percy as Eileen Allen
 Pauline Starke as Pauine Hinton
 Claire Adams as Claire Mathers
 Eva Novak as Eva Rivers
 Walter Long as Guy Benson
 Robert Edeson as Chief of Secret Service
 Rockliffe Fellowes as John Rogers
 Sheldon Lewis as Tony Hawks
 Walt Whitman as The Beachcombeer
 Frank Ridge as Frank Linke
 Chester Bishop as Anthony Roche

References

Bibliography
 Connelly, Robert B. The Silents: Silent Feature Films, 1910-36, Volume 40, Issue 2. December Press, 1998.
 Munden, Kenneth White. The American Film Institute Catalog of Motion Pictures Produced in the United States, Part 1. University of California Press, 1997.

External links
 

1924 films
1924 drama films
1920s English-language films
American silent feature films
Silent American drama films
American black-and-white films
Films directed by William H. Clifford
Selznick Pictures films
1920s American films